M. P. Sivam (M. Parameswaran Nair) is an Indian stage and film artist. He has worked as a teacher who trained stage artistes. He was also a poet and a musician.

About
His full name is Madhilagathuveedu ParamaSivam (M. Parameswaran Nair). His birthplace is Kizhakku Yakkarai, a village in Palakkad, Kerala.

He Married Sarojini Amma from Puthan house Mannalur. He has 5 children - Jyothi Kumar , Premavathi, Jayasree, Yamuna Devi, Nalina Kumari. Grand son - Suresh Babu, Sujatha, Arun, Resmi, Prajod, Sreenath puthan, Sreejith Puthan.

Though his mother tongue was Malayalam he was very proficient in Tamil. He worked as a Harmonium artiste in Yadhaartham Ponnusamy Pillai's Madurai Bala Gana Sabha. He wrote the lyrics and taught drama artistes to sing them.

Music Director K. V. Mahadevan's assistant Pughazhendhi is a relative of M. P. Sivam. Pughazhendhi's brother-inlaw is Sivam's brother. He taught music to Pughazhendhi and introduced him to K. V. Mahadevan.

Career
He started his film career as a lyricist. He wrote 8 out of the 14 songs in Kumari that was released in 1952 and featured M. G. Ramachandran in the lead role.

Sivam wrote all the 12 lyrics to Madana Mohini that was released in 1953. K. V. Mahadevan sang three songs in this film. The song Kannodu Kannaai Rahasiyam Pesi was a hit.

In Nallakalam released in 1954, he wrote 5 out of 8 songs. The song Vazhvu Malarndhu Manam Veesiduthe sung by R. Balasaraswathi Devi was a hit.

Out of 9 songs in Magathala Nattu Mary that was released in 1957, he wrote 5 songs. The first Tamil duet song sung by S. Janaki, Kannukku Naere Minnidum Tharai was penned by M. P. Sivam and included in this film. Co-singer was P. B. Srinivas.

M. P. Sivam wrote dialogues together with Puratchidasan and V. S. Jagannathan for the film Nallakalam released in 1954.

Singers
The following singers sang his songs in the films

Female singers
Jikki
K. Rani
P. Leela
A. P. Komala
N. L. Ganasaraswathi
R. Balasaraswathi Devi
Soolamangalam Rajalakshmi

Female singers (Contd.)
K. Jamuna Rani
S. Janaki
A. Andal
Sarojini
Kasthuri
K. R. Lakshmi

Male singers
A. M. Rajah
P. B. Srinivas
K. V. Mahadevan
A. M. Appadurai
K. R. Sellamuthu
S. V. Ponnusamy

Filmography

Kumari (1952)
Madana Mohini (1953)
Nallakalam (1954)
Nalla Veedu (1956)
Alavudheenum Arputha Villakkum (1957)
Magathala Nattu Mary (1957)

Devotional songs
As opportunities failed in Tamil films, he went back to Kerala. However, he continued to write devotional songs in Tamil.

His devotional songs include Kandhan Tiruneeranindhaal, Muruganai Kooppittu Muraiyidda Perukku, Thithikkum Thaen Paagum sung by T. M. Soundararajan.

References

Tamil film poets
Indian lyricists
20th-century Indian poets
Indian male poets
People from Kerala
20th-century Indian male writers